State Road 91 (NM 91) is a state highway in the US state of New Mexico.

Route Description
NM 91's southern terminus is south of Puerto de Luna where the state maintenance ends and it continues south as Paseo del Sol. It crosses the Pecos River in Puerto de Luna, then heads north into Santa Rosa. Its northern terminus is at Historic US 66 (Interstate 40 Business/U.S. Route 54) in Santa Rosa.

Major intersections

See also

References

091
Transportation in Guadalupe County, New Mexico